BSI may refer to:

Businesses and organizations
 BSI Ltd, formerly Banca della Svizzera Italiana
 BSI Group or British Standards Institution
 The Baker Street Irregulars, a literary society devoted to Sherlock Holmes
 Bank Saderat Iran
 Bank Syariah Indonesia
 Bible Society of India
 Botanical Survey of India
 British Society for Immunology
 Federal Office for Information Security (German: Bundesamt für Sicherheit in der Informationstechnik)
 Bureau of Special Investigation, Myanmar

Other uses
 BSI coupling, a railway coupling or coupler
 Back-illuminated sensor, also known as backside illumination (BSI) sensor, a type of digital image sensor
 Bloodstream infections
 Body substance isolation
 Balesin Airport, IATA code BSI

See also
 BS (disambiguation)
 BS1 (disambiguation)
 CBSI (disambiguation)
 WBSI (disambiguation)
 KBSI (disambiguation)